The London Plane was a restaurant, bakery, and grocery store in Seattle's Pioneer Square district, in the U.S. state of Washington.

Description 
The London Plane operated as a restaurant, bakery, and shop which carried flowers, wine, and other groceries. The cafe had salads with grains, egg dishes with produce, and shared plates with cheese, deviled eggs, or labneh. The Seattle Metropolitan included the business in a 2022 overview of the city's 100 best restaurants.

History 
Matt Dillon opened The London Plane in 2014. In 2022, owners Yasuaki Saito and Katherine Anderson announced plans to close in December.

See also 

 List of bakeries
 List of defunct restaurants of the United States

References

External links 

 
 

Pioneer Square, Seattle
Defunct restaurants in Seattle
2022 disestablishments in Washington (state)
Restaurants disestablished in 2022
Bakeries of Washington (state)
Defunct bakeries of the United States